Shajahan Khan (1951/1952 – 28 November 2022) was a Bangladesh Nationalist Party politician who was a Jatiya Sangsad member from the Patuakhali-3 constituency in March 1996.

References

1950s births
Year of birth missing
Place of birth missing
2022 deaths
People from Patuakhali district
Bangladesh Nationalist Party politicians
6th Jatiya Sangsad members